Lynton Richards Kistler (1897–1993) was an American master printmaker, small book publisher, and author. He became known as the best stone lithographer in the United States, at the peak of his career in 1950s. He owned and operated the lithography press, Kistler of Los Angeles.

Biography 
Lynton Richards Kistler was born August 30, 1897 in Los Angeles, California. He is descendant on his paternal side from northern Switzerland and southern Germany people, which had settled in Kistler Valley in Pennsylvania, and his maternal side was from England. His father, William A. Kistler had owned for 30 years Kistler Printing and Lithography, a Los Angeles-based lithography and letterpress shop. He attended Hollywood High School and Manual Arts High School. During World War I in 1917 to 1918, he served in the United States Army.

In the late 1920s, Kistler learned lithography in this father's shop. Early in his career he befriended and worked with Merle Armitage, and artists Jean Charlot, Edward Weston. In 1936, his father sold the printshop, and Kistler started practicing lithography in the garage and briefly opened a business. In 1941, Kistler moved to New York City to work in printmaking at Blanchard Press.

In 1945, Kistler moved back to Los Angeles and started printing for a larger group of artists at Kistler of Los Angeles. Starting in 1948, he worked with printmaker June Wayne, and inspired her to open Tamarind Lithography Workshop (now Tamarind Institute). Printmakers Joe Funk and Jan Stussy also worked in the Kistler print workshop. He stopped printing lithography in 1952 after experiencing an allergic reaction to the chemicals.

Kistler worked with many artists over the years, included Millard Sheets, Wayne Thiebaud, Lorser Feitelson, Helen Lundeberg, Beatrice Wood, Hans Burkhardt, Eugene Berman, Clinton Adams, and Joe Mugnaini.

He bought a commercial printing plant at 1653 West Temple Street in Los Angeles, which he held until 1970. From 1970 to 1976, he owned a larger commercial printing plant and ended with retirement.

Kistler taught printmaking at UCLA Extension for many years.

He died on November 9, 1993 in Laguna Hills, California, at the age of 96.

Collections 
Kistler's work is in public museum collections, including:

Bibliography

References

External links 
 Guide to the Kistler Printing and Lithography Collection from California State University, Northridge, and Online Archive of California
The Fine Arts and Lithography in Los Angeles Oral History Transcript, 1988-89: Lynton Kistler, Oral History Program, University of California, Los Angeles

1897 births
1993 deaths
American lithographers
People from Laguna Hills, California
Letterpress printmakers
Artists from Los Angeles
United States Army personnel of World War I
20th-century lithographers